This is a list of Academy Award winners and nominees born in Hungary or as Hungarians according to Hungarian nationality law-people who hold Hungarian citizenship acquired by descent from a Hungarian parent or by naturalisation.

Best Director

Best Actor in a Leading Role

Best Actor in a Supporting Role

Best Short Subject

Best Documentary (Long Subject)

Best Documentary (Short Subject)

Best Picture

Best Adapted Screenplay

Best Original Screenplay

Best Story

Best Dance Direction

Best Art Direction

Best Costume Design

Best Make Up

Best International Feature Film

Best Cinematography

Best Animated Short Film

Best Live Action Short Film

Best Original Score

Technical & Scientifical

Honorary Award

Irving G. Thalberg Memorial Award
This list focuses on recipients of Irving G. Thalberg Memorial Award.

One Grandparent

Nominations and Winners

References 

Lists of Academy Award winners and nominees by nationality or region
Academy Award winners and nominees
Academy Award winners and nominees
Hungarian film-related lists